Ma Tso Lung is a village in Sheung Shui, North District, Hong Kong.

Administration
Ma Tso Lung is one of the villages represented within the Sheung Shui District Rural Committee. For electoral purposes, Ma Tso Lung is part of the Sheung Shui Rural constituency, which is currently represented by Simon Hau Fuk-tat.

See also
 MacIntosh Forts

References

Villages in North District, Hong Kong
Sheung Shui